The McComb School District is a public school district based in McComb, Mississippi (USA).

Schools
McComb High School
1982-1983 National Blue Ribbon School
Denman Junior High School
Higgins Middle School
Kennedy Elementary School
Otken Elementary School

Demographics

2006-07 school year
There were a total of 2,964 students enrolled in the McComb School District during the 2006–2007 school year. The gender makeup of the district was 49% female and 51% male. The racial makeup of the district was 83.81% African American, 15.15% White, 0.71% Asian, 0.17% Native American, and 0.17% Hispanic. 90.1% of the district's students were eligible to receive free lunch.

Previous school years

Accountability statistics

See also
List of school districts in Mississippi

References

External links

Education in Pike County, Mississippi
School districts in Mississippi
McComb, Mississippi